Sven Erik Gunnar Lundgren (17 July 1901 – 30 October 1982) was a Swedish decathlete. He competed in the 1928 Summer Olympics and finished in 14th place.

References

1901 births
1982 deaths
Swedish decathletes
Athletes (track and field) at the 1928 Summer Olympics
Olympic athletes of Sweden
People from Gävle
Sportspeople from Gävleborg County